Llanthony Road Bridge is a bridge over the Gloucester and Sharpness Canal in the Gloucester Docks and High Orchard area. It is the third bridge on the site.

See also
 High Orchard Bridge

References

External links

Bridges in Gloucestershire

Llanthony Road Bridge in action.

Buildings and structures in Gloucester
Gloucester Docks